Moses ben Isaac ha-Levi Hurwitz (died 25 October 1820) was a rabbi from Krozh, Kovno Governorate.

He was on intimate terms with the Vilna Gaon, and was the teacher of his sons. He became maggid of Vilna, and occupied that position for many years, until he lost his voice. He was succeeded by Rabbi Ezekiel Feivel of Dretchin (about 1811). His son Ḥayyim was the father of Lazar Lipman Hurwitz. The work entitled Mo'ade ha-shem (Vilna, 1802), on the Jewish calendar, is often credited to Hurwitz.

References
 

1820 deaths
19th-century Lithuanian Jews
Maggidim
People from Vilna Governorate
People from Rossiyensky Uyezd
Rabbis from the Russian Empire
Rabbis from Vilnius